The 2008–09 season of Barnsley Football Club saw the club participate in the Football League Championship.

Preparation for 2008–09

The first signing for the new season was announced on 25 June; Canadian international striker Iain Hume in a £1.2 million switch from relegated Leicester City , the club's first seven-figure signing since 1999. On 27 June, Barnsley signed Argentine defensive midfielder Hugo Colace from Newell's Old Boys and French left winger come left-back Mounir El Haimour from Swiss side Neuchâtel Xamax. On 2 July, a transfer was secured for experienced central defender Darren Moore of Derby County. The final pre-season transfer came on 8 August with a season-long loan deal for  Maceo Rigters from Blackburn Rovers.
On 26 January 2009, it was confirmed that Daniel Bogdanovic had signed for Barnsley for an undisclosed fee, signing a deal until 2010. Michael Mifsud joined Barnsley on loan until the end of the season on 2 February 2009 on the same day as Andranik Teymourian and Adam Hammill joined fellow Malta teammate Daniel Bogdanovic at Oakwell.

Players in

Players out

2008–09 Season

Overview
During the start of the 2008-09 season, Barnsley won only two of their first ten league matches and went on a run of five games without scoring a goal. The Reds clinched the loan signing of Derby winger Gary Teale for a month on 15 August, covering for the midfield injuries of Mounir El Haimour, Jamal Campbell-Ryce and the failure to gain international clearance for Hugo Colace.

The team received a boost the following month when Colace's work permit was finally granted, along with the return to fitness of both Heinz Muller and Anderson, who had been out injured for seven months. The club also made history in their away game at Ipswich Town on 30 September when they fielded striker Reuben Noble-Lazarus, who became the Football League's youngest ever player at 15 years and 45 days; beating a record which had stood since 1929.

The tykes achieved their second league win of the season as they managed to beat Doncaster Rovers 4–1 at Oakwell. However, the disappointing away form continued with a 3–0 defeat to Crystal Palace. Fortunately, the following Tuesday, the Reds defeated Sheffield Wednesday for the first time in eight years by prevailing 2–1. A 0–0 draw with Bristol City was next, then the month was capped off in fine style with a 1–0 win over Doncaster Rovers at the Keepmoat Stadium.

The Reds began November as they had ended October, with an away win. This time Charlton yielded to the Reds. The next game, at home to Sheffield Utd was to bring mountains of controversy. The main talking point of the game was the injury to Barnsley striker Iain Hume who suffered a fractured skull and internal bleeding after being elbowed by Chris Morgan. Barnsley are pondering whether to pursue legal action against Morgan for the challenge which could have ended Hume's life as well as his career.

Barnsley defeated Watford, again coming from behind to win, before losing late on to play off candidates Preston North End F.C. Despite this, on the live sky game, and almost blowing a 3–0 lead, Burnley were beaten at Oakwell. 3–2.

Short match reports

Coca-Cola Championship unless stated.

Matchday One – Queens Park Rangers 2–1 Barnsley

Barnsley's new season got off to a flying start with Iain Hume scoring his first Barnsley goal just five minutes into his debut. However, two goals in as many minutes from Fitz Hall resulted in a defeat despite a battling performance from the side. Marciano van Homoet was dismissed late on for a crude challenge on Dani Parejo.

Carling Cup First Round – Crewe Alexandra 2–0 Barnsley

Two penalties from Michael O'Connor and Anthony Elding were enough to see Crewe through to Round Two despite a possession barrage from the Reds throughout the game.

Matchday Two – Barnsley 1–2 Coventry City

The visitors put themselves in front after ten minutes here, with a strike from Freddy Eastwood. Captain Brian Howard managed an equaliser just before the break, but a second half goal from Julian Gray proved decisive. Iain Hume was sent off late on for the hosts.

Matchday Three – Birmingham City 2–0 Barnsley

Goals from Kevin Phillips and Garry O'Connor were enough to see Birmingham to a 2–0 win at St Andrews despite a gallant performance from the Reds.

Matchday Four – Barnsley 2–0 Derby County

It took seventy-one minutes, but a stunning strike from Iain Hume and a Stephen Foster header were enough to secure Barnsley's first win of the season against struggling Derby County.

Matchday Five – Blackpool 1–0 Barnsley

A single goal by Steve Kabba in the 86th minute sunk the Reds who had the best of the game.

Matchday Six – Barnsley 0–1 Cardiff City

Another disappointing result for Barnsley as Cardiff left Oakwell with all three points. Peter Whittingham scored the only goal of the game following a defensive error by Darren Moore.

Matchday Seven – Southampton 0–0 Barnsley

Another goalless performance from the Reds should have reaped reward when Iain Hume rounded the keeper, only to shoot into the side netting. This game marked the return to fitness of Heinz Muller and Anderson, as well as being Brian Howard's last game in a Barnsley shirt before his move to Sheffield United.

Matchday Eight – Barnsley 0–0 Norwich City

Goalless again after another frustrating day for the reds. Jon Macken missed a penalty kick in the first half.

Matchday Nine – Ipswich Town 3–0 Barnsley

Goals from Jon Stead, Owen Garvan and Iván Campo heaped the pressure upon Barnsley manager Simon Davey. The main talking point of the match, however, was Reuben Noble-Lazarus who came off the bench to become the Football League's youngest ever player at 15 years and 45 days.

Matchday Ten – Barnsley 4–1 Doncaster Rovers

Barnsley found themselves a goal down early on in this derby match thanks to a penalty from Brian Stock and down to ten men as Darren Moore was sent off early in the second half. However, a headed goal from Stephen Foster and a spectacular individual effort from Jamal Campbell-Ryce, as well as further strikes from substitute Jon Macken and Iain Hume, ended their five game goal drought and made this their second win of the season. The result also equalled the Red's best result under manager Simon Davey.

Matchday Eleven – Crystal Palace 3–0 Barnsley

Another poor away performance from the Reds saw Crystal Palace ease to victory in this encounter with a first-half penalty from Ben Watson, who scored another in the second half before Shefki Kuqi made it three.

Matchday Twelve – Barnsley 2–1 Sheffield Wednesday

A second home derby win of the season gave the fans something to smile about here, with Iain Hume putting his side in front after just four minutes. The Reds cause was helped with the sending off of Tony McMahon thirty minutes later, and a second-half penalty which Jamal Campbell-Ryce slotted home rendering Leon Clarke's subsequent penalty a mere consolation.

Matchday Thirteen – Barnsley 0–0 Bristol City

A game the Reds should have won turned into a 0–0 draw. Jon Macken and Iain Hume should both have scored but were denied by Adriano Basso.

Matchday Fourteen – Doncaster Rovers 0–1 Barnsley

Barnsley completed the early season double over Donny after a 1–0 win at the Keepmoat Stadium. A 42nd-minute goal from Jon Macken was enough to give the Reds all three points.

Matchday Fifteen – Charlton Athletic 1–3 Barnsley

A second successive away win for the Reds sees them rise significantly in the table. Jon Macken open the scoring within ten minutes of play, and then scored his second on the fifteen-minute mark before Darren Moore made it three with a headed goal before half-time. Mark Hudson pulled one back for his team in the second half, but ultimately this was a deserved win for Barnsley.

Matchday Sixteen – Barnsley 1–2 Sheffield United

The Reds' good run came to an end at the hands of South Yorkshire rivals Sheffield United James Beattie gave the Blades the lead before Ugo Ehiogu and Anderson de Silva both saw red for a tangle between the two. Beattie made it two after a controversial penalty award by the linesman, following referee Andy D'Urso's hesitation to award. Kayode Odejayi pulled one back for Barnsley, but it was too little too late. The game was marred by a serious, life-threatening injury to Barnsley striker Iain Hume. Hume suffered a fractured skull and internal bleeding after a shocking elbow by former Barnsley captain Chris Morgan.

Matchday Seventeen – Barnsley 2–1 Watford

Barnsley came from behind to win the game against Watford. The away side took the lead through Tommy Smith, but the Reds staged a fine fightback when Miguel Mostto slammed in, and two minutes later Stephen Foster marked his first game as Club captain with a scrambled effort.

Matchday Eighteen – Preston North End 2–1 Barnsley

Barnsley were beaten late on again. Richard Chaplow put Preston ahead but Jamal Campbell-Ryce responded with a shot from 20 yards. Preston weren't to be denied however and Sean St Ledger won it in the 88th minute with a deflected shot.

Matchday Nineteen – Barnsley 3–2 Burnley

In the live Sky game the Reds defeated Burnley, but made it more difficult than it should've been. Jon Macken put the Reds in front after eighteen minutes. The Reds made a lightning start to the second half with Simon Whaley deflecting in Jamal Campbell-Ryce's shot. Diego León made it three minutes later. Burnley substitute Martin Paterson made it a nervy last 20 minutes with two goals in four minutes. Reds keeper Heinz Muller made two fine stops to preserve the lead.

Matchday Twenty – Nottingham Forest 1–0 Barnsley

In a tight contest, a first half goal from Joe Garner was all that separated the two sides here.

Matchday Twenty-One – Barnsley 0–1 Reading

After a delayed kick-off Barnsley were unable to take any points from high-flying Reading, who won the match courtesy of a second-half goal from Brynjar Gunnarsson.

Matchday Twenty-Two – Swansea City 2–2 Barnsley

After a goalless first half, a strike from Jon Macken and a penalty from Jamal Campbell-Ryce had the reds looking comfortable until Jason Scotland pulled one back before grabbing the equaliser fifteen seconds from the final whistle.

Matchday Twenty-Three – Wolverhampton Wanderers 2–0 Barnsley

Barnsley were unable to pick up any points against high-flying Wolverhampton Wanderers. An early own goal from Bobby Hassell put the home side in front, and then Kevin Foley's late strike sealed the win for the Championship leaders.

Matchday Twenty-Four – Barnsley 2–0 Plymouth Argyle

Half an hour into this match, Simon Walton was shown a red card for a professional foul and Plymouth found themselves down to ten men. Barnsley subsequently went in front when Jon Macken nodded home after Anderson headed down from a Diego León free kick, which was followed by a late penalty from Jamal Campbell-Ryce when Leon was brought down in the box.

Matchday Twenty-Five – Burnley 1–2 Barnsley

The Reds completed their second league double of the season with a fine win at Burnley. Jamie Cureton put the Reds in front with his first goal for the club before Chris McCann struck to equalise. With 20 minutes left, McCann diverted Jamal Campbell-Ryce's shot into his own net.

Matchday Twenty-Six – Barnsley 1–1 Preston North End

Jamie Cureton gave the Reds an early lead with a delightful chip and after Anderson de Silva hit the bar for Barnsley, Ross Wallace equalised after a dubious free-kick award.

FA Cup Third Round – West Ham United 3–0 Barnsley

Goals from Hérita Ilunga, a penalty from Mark Noble and Carlton Cole saw off the Reds who failed to re-create the antics of last season's FA Cup as they crashed out in the Third Round.

Matchday Twenty-Seven – Barnsley 0–1 Southampton

A late header by David McGoldrick gave Southampton the win after the Reds dominated the majority of the game with chances from Jamie Cureton and Maceo Rigters going awry.

Matchday Twenty-Eight – Norwich City 4–0 Barnsley

Goals from Wes Hoolahan, returning from Barnsley Jamie Cureton, a penalty from Sammy Clingan and Darel Russell sunk the Reds as they crashed to a sickening defeat.

Matchday Twenty-Nine – Barnsley 1–2 Ipswich Town

Barnsley lost again as two early goals from Jon Stead gave the Reds a massive uphill task but debutant Daniel Bogdanovic gave them some hope early in the second half.

Matchday Thirty – Bristol City 2–0 Barnsley

Another defeat at Ashton Gate as goals from Gavin Williams and ex-Red Michael McIndoe gave City a comfortable win.

Matchday Thirty-One – Sheffield Wednesday 0–1 Barnsley

A sensational goal by Jamal Campbell-Ryce gave Barnsley a historic double over Sheff Wed after the earlier win in October. The real hero though, was Bobby Hassell who made an unbelievable goal-line clearance in the dying moments to send the four thousand Reds fans home delighted.

Matchday Thirty-Two – Barnsley 0–0 Charlton Athletic

An appalling game at Oakwell ended 0–0 which left both sides in relegation mire.

Matchday Thirty-Three – Barnsley 2–1 Queens Park Rangers

The Reds took the lead with a goal created in Malta, Michael Mifsud crossing for countryman Daniel Bogdanovic to glance home. Damien Delaney equalised for QPR but Anderson de Silva smashed home just before half time to seal the win.

Matchday Thirty-Four – Cardiff City 3–1 Barnsley

The Reds recent poor form against Cardiff continued as Joe Ledley and Michael Chopra fired the Bluebirds into a 2–0 lead before half time. The Reds pulled one back through Jon Macken three minutes before Andranik was sent off. Peter Whittingham sealed the points for Cardiff.

Matchday Thirty-Five – Barnsley 1–1 Birmingham City

A dull game lit up in the last ten minutes when Michael Mifsud put the Reds in front with his first goal for the club. But just three minutes later Martin Taylor equalised through hesitant defending from a free-kick.

Matchday Thirty-Six – Barnsley 0–1 Blackpool

A solitary goal on 70 minutes by Wednesday loanee Wade Small piled the pressure on Simon Davey as the Reds sunk into the bottom three.

Matchday Thirty-Seven – Barnsley 3–1 Crystal Palace

Palace took the lead through Shefki Kuqi early on but goals from Jamal Campbell-Ryce, an own goal by Palace youngster Lee Hills and Michael Mifsud gave the Reds a vital three points.

Matchday Thirty-Eight – Derby County 0–0 Barnsley

The Reds dominated much of the game against Derby but were left frustrated as they missed numerous chances to take all three points at Pride Park.

Matchday Thirty-Nine – Barnsley 1–1 Nottingham Forest

After a goalless first half Jamal Campbell-Ryce gave the reds the lead in this battle between two strugglers. However, celebrations turned to frustrations when Campbell-Ryce missed from the penalty spot. Robert Earnshaw scored the equalizer for Forest not long after.

Matchday Forty – Sheffield United 2–1 Barnsley

Barnsley looked on course to take a point from this South Yorkshire derby, yet in the last ten minutes quick fire goals from John-Joe O'Toole and Arturo Lupoli put the blades 2–0 up. Jamal Campbell-Ryce then missed a penalty for Barnsley in the closing minutes, meaning that an injury time Daniel Bogdanovic strike proved to be a mere consolation.

Matchday Forty-One – Watford 1–1 Barnsley

Further late disappointment at Vicarage Road, as Jon Macken gave the reads the lead on 67 minutes, only for Tommy Smith to equalize for Watford with two minutes remaining.

Matchday Forty-Two – Barnsley 1–3 Swansea City

Goals from Ashley Williams, Jordi Gomez and Jason Scotland gave Swansea a comfortable win at Oakwell. Daniel Bogdanovic scored a late consolation from the penalty spot.

Matchday Forty-Three – Reading 0–0 Barnsley

A Strong performance from the reds saw them take a crucial point against promotion chasing Reading.

Matchday Forty-Four – Coventry City 1–1 Barnsley

The reds looked like securing a vital win as Daniel Bogdanovic gave them the lead after just nine minutes. But in the final moments of the game the referee awarded a controversial penalty for a disputed handball against Rob Kozluk.  Elliot Ward scored to snatch a point for Coventry.

Matchday Forty-Five – Barnsley 1–1 Wolverhampton Wanderers

In their final home game of the season, Jon Macken sent the Reds on their way to a vital three points in their fight against relegation, but with six minutes remaining, Kyle Reid struck an equalizer for Wolves, earning the visitors the required point to confirm their status as the champions of the 2008/09 Coca-Cola championship.

Matchday Forty-Six – Plymouth Argyle 1–2 Barnsley

Knowing they needed only a point to secure their championship status, Barnsley fell behind at Plymouth courtesy of Gary Sawyer's header in the twelfth minute. Nonetheless, on-loan Liverpool winger Adam Hammill struck his first Red's goal to level the score ten minutes from half-time. Jamal Campbell-Ryce struck what proved to be the winner two minutes into the second half, to confirm a fourth straight season in the Coca-Cola championship.

Competitions

Championship

League table

Results summary

Results by round

Matches

FA Cup

League Cup

Goalscorers 
League goals (cup goals)

  Jamal Campbell-Ryce 8
  Jon Macken 8
  Daniel Bogdanovic 4
  Iain Hume 4
  Stephen Foster 3
  Jamie Cureton* 2 
  Anderson de Silva 2
  Michael Mifsud 2
  Darren Moore 1
  Simon Whaley* 1
  Diego León 1
  Kayode Odejayi 1
  Miguel Mostto* 1
  Brian Howard* 1
  Own goals 2

(*) No longer with the club.

References

Barnsley F.C. seasons
Barnsley F.C.